Veo Easley (1932 - 2003) was an accountant, judge, and businessman who served in the Arkansas House of Representatives. He lived in Grant County, Arkansas.

He was a county clerk from 1963 to 1968. He was a county judge from 1969 to 1982. He served in the Arkansas House of Representatives from 1983 to 1994. He was married to Dean Rogers Easley.

References

This draft is in progress as of October 18, 2022.

County judges in Arkansas
1932 births
2003 deaths
American accountants
20th-century American judges
County clerks in Arkansas
20th-century American politicians
Members of the Arkansas House of Representatives
People from Grant County, Arkansas